Tongo Eisen-Martin is an American poet and activist. He is the current poet laureate of San Francisco, California.

Biography

Tongo Eisen-Martin was born in 1980 in San Francisco, California to a revolutionary mother Arlene Eisen. His parents named him after Josiah Tongogara. Muralist Miranda Bergman is his godmother. He has a younger brother named Biko, and they both attended Meadows-Livingstone school in San Francisco as children. He earned a bachelor's and master's degree in African-American Studies, all from Columbia University where he taught at the Institute for Research in African-American Studies, creating the 2012 curriculum We Charge Genocide Again! He has also taught at detention centers, including San Quentin and Rikers Island. He is the co-founder of Black Freighter Press.

Honors and awards

Eisen-Martin's 2017 book Heaven Is All Goodbyes published by City Lights won a PEN Oakland Award, the 2018 American Book Award, 2018 California Book Award, and 2018 National California Booksellers Association Poetry Book of the Year. His 2020 title Blood on the Fog published by City Lights was named a Best Poetry Book of 2021 by Elisa Gabbert of the New York Times.

Works
Someone's Dead Already. Bootstrap Press. 2015. 
Heaven is All Goodbyes. City Lights. 2017. 
Waiting Behind Tornados for Food. Materials. 2020.
Blood on the Fog: Pocket Poets Series No. 62 Tongo Eisen-Martin. City Lights. 2021.

References

21st-century American poets
Poets Laureate of San Francisco
Living people
Poets from California
African-American poets
1980 births
Municipal Poets Laureate in the United States
21st-century African-American writers
20th-century African-American people
Columbia College (New York) alumni

Columbia Graduate School of Arts and Sciences alumni